Filip Palda (May 12, 1962 – August 24, 2017) was a full professor in Economics at the École nationale d’administration publique (ENAP) and a Senior Fellow at the Fraser Institute. He held a master's degree from Queen's University and a Ph.D. in economics from the University of Chicago, where he studied under Gary S. Becker (Nobel prize in Economics).

His research interests included cost-benefit analysis, tax analysis, Public Choice, the underground economy, and the effects of electoral rules on political competition.

Publications
The complete archive of Filip Palda's publications is available on the ENAP's website: http://enap.uquebec.ca/enap-fra/bibliotheque/pub-personnel/publi-palda-filip.html

His published books are:

 A Better Kind of Violence:Chicago Political Economy, Public Choice, and the Quest for an Ultimate Theory of Power. Ottawa, Canada., Cooper-Wolfling, 2016. 132 p. http://www.coopwolf.com 
 The Apprentice Economist: Seven Steps to Mastery. Ottawa, Canada., Cooper-Wolfling, 2013. 291 p. http://www.apprentecon.com
 Pareto's Republic and the New Science of Peace. Ottawa, Canada., Cooper-Wolfling, 2011. 128 p. http://www.paretorepublic.com
 Tax Evasion and Firm Survival in Competitive Markets. Cheltenham, G.-B., Edward Elgar, 2001. 144 p. 
 PALDA, Filip and BOUCHER, Michel. Ici le peuple gouverne : pour une réforme de la démocratie. Montréal, Varia, 2000. 272 p. 
 Home on the Urban Range : An Idea Map for Reforming the City. Vancouver, Fraser Institute, 1998. 117 p.  
 Here the People Rule : A Toolbook for Reforming Democracy. St. Paul, Minn., Professors World Peace Academy, 1997. 195 p. 
 PALDA, Filip, HORRY, Isabella and WALKER, Michael. Tax facts 10. Vancouver, Fraser Institute, 1997. 155 p. 
 Essays in Canadian Surface Transportation. Vancouver, Fraser Institute, 1995. 178 p. 
 It's No Gamble : The Economic and Social Benefits of Stock Markets. Vancouver, Fraser Institute, 1995. 173 p. 
 L'État interventionniste : le gouvernement provincial et l'économie du Québec. Vancouver, Fraser Institute, 1994. 216 p. 
 How Much Is Your Vote Worth? : The Unfairness of Campaign Spending Limits. San Francisco, Cal., ICS Press, 1994. 143 p. 
 Provincial Trade Wars : Why the Blockade Must End. Vancouver, Fraser Institute, 1994. 170 p. 
 PALDA, Filip, HORRY, Isabella and WALKER, Michael. Tax Facts 9. Vancouver, Fraser Institute, 1994. 156 p.  
 PALDA, Filip (adaptation) and TULLOCK, Gordon. The New Federalist. Vancouver, Fraser Institute, 1994. 141 p. (Adapted for Canada by Filip Palda).
 PALDA, Filip, HORRY, Isabella and WALKER, Michael. Tax facts 8. Vancouver, Fraser Institute, 1992. 151 p. 
 Election Finance Regulation in Canada : A Critical Review. Vancouver, Fraser Institute, 1991. 132 p.

Other external links
 Filip Palda's page on ENAP's website: http://enap.uquebec.ca/enap/2890/Informations_professionnelles.enap?view=fonction&indid=447
 Fraser Institute: http://www.fraserinstitute.org/

Canadian economists
University of Chicago alumni
Queen's University at Kingston alumni
Living people
1962 births